Neeraja Kona is an Indian stylist and costume designer who works in Telugu and Tamil films.

Career
Kona began her career assisting styling for Jr NTR and Kajal Aggarwal for Baadshah (2013) directed by Srinu Vaitla. She was stylist on Nithiin for Gunde Jaari Gallanthayyinde. Nithiin then signed her on for his next two movies Courier Boy Kalyan and Puri Jagannadh's Heart Attack. She later met Samantha Ruth Prabhu, and became her personal stylist.

Early on in her career Kona got to be part of the films Trivikram Srinivas and Pawan Kalyan's Attarintiki Daredi and Harish Shankar's Ramayya Vasthavayya. She designed costumes for Samantha Ruth Prabhu in both films. She has worked with the directors Trivikram Srinivas, Harish Shankar, Vamsi Paidipally, and V. V. Vinayak. Her current projects include Hansika's Romeo and Juliet, Gopichand Malineni's Pandaga Chesko, Krishna Vamsi's Govindudu Andarivadele, Nithin and Karunakaran's Movie. She has also assisted in styling Allu Arjun and Kajal Aggarwal in Yevadu, Nithin and Yami Gautam in Courier Boy Kalyan, Samantha Ruth Prabhu and Pranitha Subhash in Jr NTR - Santosh Srinivas's project and Sudheer Babu in two songs from Aadu Magaadra Bujji. She was also a lyric writer for few songs in the films Thikka, Chal Mohan Ranga and Miss India which are composed by S.S.Thaman.

Filmography

References

External links

1983 births
Living people
Telugu people
People from Guntur district
Film people from Andhra Pradesh
21st-century Indian designers
Women artists from Andhra Pradesh
21st-century Indian women artists
Indian costume designers